The 2014–15 season was FC Ararat Yerevan's 24th consecutive season in the Armenian Premier League. Ararat finished the season in 8th position, escaping relegation as no team was promoted. In the Armenian Cup they were knocked out by Pyunik in the Quarterfinals.

Season events
Prior to the start of the season, Ararat traveled to Georgia for a 10-day training camp and three friendly games, with new signings Levon Minasyan, Gor Matirosyan, Ararat Poghosyan and Narek Amiryan. Also part of the travelling squad was trialist Alexander Zelenov, with new French signings Zaven Bulut and Robin Di Lauro joining the squad in Georgia.

At the beginning of August, Ararat signed a trio of players from Los Angeles Misioneros, midfielders Jamel Wallace, Bryan de la Fuente and Christian King. On 23 August, Serbian defender Nikola Prebiračević and American winger Darryl Odom signed for Ararat Yerevan.

On 26 September Samvel Darbinyan replaced Dušan Mijić as manager of Ararat. With Samvel Darbinyan's contract expiring on 1 December, Suren Chakhalyan was appointed manager a week later.

On 1 December, Aleksandar Rakić signed a new one-year contract with Ararat, keeping him at the club until 1 December 2015, whilst Zdravko Kovačević's contract expired and Gor Matirosyan, Christian King and Darryl Odom all the left club by mutual consent a couple days later.

On 16 December, Ararat announced the return of Gorik Khachatryan and Vahe Martirosyan, whilst Armen Durunts and Avetis Ghazatyan departed by mutual consent. The following day, Aram Ayrapetyan joined the club from Banants.

In January Ararat resumed training, taking part in a training camp in Sochi. Whilst at the camp, they signed contracts with Karen Israelyan, Nagui Bouras, Oleksandr Volchkov, Raffi Kaya, Hossein Hosseini, Saman Aghazamani, Amiri Shoeib, Victor Garza, Carlo Chueca and Oumarou Kaina. 
Ararat also took Jevgenij Moroz and Bavon Tshibuabua on trial, and Jamel Wallace, Čedomir Tomčić and Nikola Prebiračević all left the club after their contract where terminated by mutual consent.

On 14 April, manager Suren Chakhalyan resigned from his role.

Squad

Transfers

In

Released

Trialists

Friendlies

Competitions

Premier League

Results summary

Results by round

Results

Table

Armenian Cup

Statistics

Appearances and goals

|-
|colspan="14"|Players who left Ararat Yerevan during the season:

|}

Goal scorers

Clean sheets

Disciplinary Record

References

FC Ararat Yerevan seasons
Ararat Yerevan